Skylight is a means of daylighting.

Skylight may also refer to:
 Skylight (play), by David Hare
 Skylight of a lava tube, a hole in the ceiling of the tube
 Skylight, Arkansas
 Skylight, Kentucky
 Skylight, a short film by David Clayton Rogers
 Skylight Pictures, a film company
 Skylight Music Theatre, a light opera and musical theatre company in Milwaukee, Wisconsin
 Skylight 1A, a photographic filter factor that absorbs ultraviolet radiation
 Lenovo Skylight, a cancelled project for a small portable computer with mobile telephone
 Mount Skylight, in the Adirondack Mountains of New York
 Skylight (band), a South African pop rock band
 Skylight (novel), a 2011 novel by José Saramago
 Skylight (Art Lande, Dave Samuels and Paul McCandless album), 1981
 Skylight (Pinegrove album), 2018

See also
 Diffuse sky radiation
 Light pollution